"Put a Little Love on Me" is a song by Irish singer Niall Horan. It was released through Capitol Records as the second single from his second studio album Heartbreak Weather on 6 December 2019.

Background and promotion
Horan first performed the song on 7 August 2019 at the Capitol Congress 2019, where he also announced his previous single "Nice to Meet Ya". About the song, the singer revealed that his upcoming project would not be his album "if it didn't have a sad, sad, sad ballad on it" and that the song "could potentially be my favorite song I've ever written". Lyrically, the song reportedly deals with the break-up with singer Hailee Steinfeld in December 2018. He announced the release of the song and shared a snippet on his social media on 5 December 2019.

Live performances
On December 15, 2019 Horan performed the song for the first time on Saturday Night Live. On March 10, 2020 Horan performed the song on The Late Late Show with James Corden.

Critical reception
Mike Wass of Idolator called the song the Irish star’s best ballad since "This Town", particularly complimenting "the lovely chorus" and his decision to go back "to the stripped-back sound palette of Flicker. Madeline Roth, writing for MTV, described the song as a "heartbreaking ballad" while writing that Horan "managed to completely tug at our heartstrings with this one".

Charts

Certifications

References

2010s ballads
2019 singles
2019 songs
Niall Horan songs
Folk ballads
Songs written by Jamie Scott
Songs written by Niall Horan
Songs written by Dan Bryer
Songs written by Mike Needle